Golam Morshed Farooqi (29 August 1930 – 11 January 2014) is a Awami League politician and the former Member of Parliament of Comilla-23.

Career
Farooqi was elected to parliament from Comilla-23 as an Awami League candidate in 1973.

References

Awami League politicians
Living people
1st Jatiya Sangsad members
1930 births